Empylus (1st century BC) was an Ancient Roman rhetorician. He was the companion, as we are told by Plutarch, of Brutus, to whom he dedicated a short essay, not destitute of merit, on the death of Caesar. It is not stated to what country he belonged.

"Empylus the Rhodian" is mentioned in a passage of Quintilian, where the text is very doubtful, as an orator referred to by Cicero, but no such name occurs in any  extant work of the latter.

References

Footnotes

Ancient Roman rhetoricians